St. Francis Preparatory School, commonly known as St. Francis Prep, is a private, independent Catholic college preparatory school in Fresh Meadows, Queens, New York City, New York. It is the largest non-diocesan Catholic high school in the United States. St. Francis is run by the Franciscan Brothers of Brooklyn, who maintain a residence on the top floor of the school. As of the 2015–16 school year, enrollment at St. Francis was 2,489.

History

St. Francis Preparatory originated as St. Francis Academy, a small all-boys high school on 300 Baltic Street in Brooklyn, New York, founded by the Franciscans Brothers of Brooklyn (O.S.F.). The college section became St. Francis College, a private predominantly undergraduate college in Brooklyn Heights. It took its current name in 1935, then moved to a larger facility in Williamsburg, Brooklyn in 1952. The school moved to its current location in Fresh Meadows, Queens in 1974 when it acquired the facility that formerly housed Bishop Reilly High School, a co-educational Catholic high school. The school began admitting female students that same year. A fitness center was added recently and the science labs are being updated. There are currently plans to add a three-story addition to the rear of the existing building. The upgrades to the art rooms will support students in the studio, digital and the performing arts.

Co-curricular activities and athletics
St. Francis Prep has a rivalry with Holy Cross High School, fueled particularly by their football teams. Known as the "Battle of the Boulevard" due to the two schools being located only 2 miles apart on Francis Lewis Boulevard, the rivalry between the Prep Terriers and the Holy Cross Knights has been called "arguably the greatest rivalry in New York City football."

Notable alumni

Ted Alexandro, stand-up comedian
William Alfred, Harvard professor, poet, playwright
Frank J. Aquila, corporate lawyer
Marco Battaglia, NFL football player
Michelle Betos, NWSL goalkeeper
Des Bishop, stand-up comedian
Joe Schad (born c. 1974) is a reporter, writer, analyst and broadcaster
Vincent DePaul Breen, former Bishop of Diocese of Metuchen  
Patti Ann Browne, news anchor for the Fox News Channel
Tiffany Cabán, member of the New York City Council
Julie Chen, former news anchor for CBS, Daytime Emmy Award winning co-host of The Talk and hostess of reality show Big Brother 
Carlos Dengler, former bassist of band Interpol
Gerry DiNardo, former college football coach and current Big Ten Network commentator
James Dooley, Emmy Award-winning composer
Sonny Dove (1963), college and NBA basketball player, fourth pick of 1967 NBA draft
Emily Engstler, WNBA basketball player on Indiana Pacers and 2022 U23 3x3 USA National Basketball team member
Peter Facinelli, actor
Kyle Flood, University of Texas football offensive coordinator and former Rutgers football head coach.
Eric Gioia, New York City councilman
Abbas "Bas" Hamad, rapper
Dan Henning, NFL football player and coach
Ed Jenkins, NFL football player
Vince Lombardi, former Green Bay Packers coach and namesake of the Lombardi Award and the Vince Lombardi Trophy
Glen Mazzara, writer and television producer
Joanne Persico, volleyball coach
Bill Pickel, NFL football player and sports broadcaster
Keith Powers, American politician, Democrat, and council member for the 4th district of the New York City Council
Frank Serpico, New York police officer known for uncovering corruption
Father Robert S. Smith, American Catholic priest, author, and educator
Joe Torre, former MLB player, former New York Mets, Atlanta Braves, St. Louis Cardinals, New York Yankees and Los Angeles Dodgers manager

References

External links
 

Preparatory schools in New York City
Educational institutions established in 1858
Roman Catholic Diocese of Brooklyn
Franciscan high schools
1858 establishments in New York (state)
Roman Catholic high schools in Queens, New York